Statistics of Úrvalsdeild in the 1947 season.

Overview
It was contested by 5 teams, and Fram won the championship. Valur's Einar Halldórsson (Valur)and Albert Guðmundsson, as well as ÍA's Ríkharður Jónsson and KR's Hörður Óskarsson, were the joint top scorers with 3 goals. ·

League standings

Results

References

Úrvalsdeild karla (football) seasons
Iceland
Iceland
Urvalsdeild